Closer than a Brother is a 1925 silent short animated film created by Fables Studios. It is among the early cartoons of the Aesop's Fables series created when its originator Paul Terry was still involved.

Plot
A cat stubbornly refuses to get off of bed but eventually does, thanks to his helpful animated clock. He then plays some music in a stereo for exercising, and later goes to the dining room where he has flapjacks for breakfast. Finally he heads for work in his bicycle.

The cat works in a poultry compound run by a strict geezer. One of his duties is to make sure the hens are laying a sufficient number of eggs. He then courteously directs the geezer to the office. Also entering the office is a ballerina who is a typist as well as the cat's love interest. The cat likes the ballerina a lot that he goes on to trade kisses with her. Finding the romance potentially distracting, the geezer intervenes and tells the cat to package the eggs in racks.

At the egg-packaging area in the compound, the cat tells the hens to roll eggs down the slides. As the eggs come down, the cat pushes one rack after another each time one becomes full. After filling several racks and getting tired a little, he becomes uncommitted and therefore abandons his work which is far from finished. He then comes to and invites the ballerina to play with him outside. While they are having fun playing jump rope, a lot of eggs end up smashed on the floor as a result of an overfilled rack which is left unmoved.

In the office, the geezer is napping. Momentarily, he gets up and heads to the egg-packaging place to check the cat's work. To his horror, he sees the mess piling up which indicate hundreds of dollars in losses.

Just outside the compound, the cat and the ballerina are still playing with each other. In no time the infuriated geezer comes out and confronts them. The geezer relieves the cat of employment before taking the ballerina back inside.

In the packaging area, the geezer reprimands the weeping ballerina. The disposed cat sneaks in and sees what's going on. The cat then climbs a stack of egg-filled racks before pushing and dropping one off. That rack falls on and flattens the geezer unconscious. The cat picks up the ballerina and runs with her into the horizon.

Characters
The cat in the film bears a close resemblance to Felix the Cat. The cat's design is based on how most cats appear in the series as early as 1922; Felix, during that year, still looks like Master Tom (the original character at which Felix evolved from), having a more protruding snout. The cat also did not like the ballerina at first in A Cat's Life (1923) but somehow developed affection for her a few films later.

The geezer looks somewhat similar to Poopdeck Pappy who would later appear in the Popeye comic strip in 1936 (and in animated films in 1938). But unlike Poopdeck, the geezer wears glasses, boots, and overalls. Both men maybe at old age but show ability as if they are a lot younger.

References

External links
Closer than a Brother at the Big Cartoon Database

1925 films
1925 animated films
American silent short films
American animated short films
American black-and-white films
Aesop's Fables (film series)
1920s American animated films
Animated films about cats
1920s English-language films